Felipe Zetter Zetter (3 July 1923 – 15 March 2013) was a Mexican football defender who played for Mexico national team in the 1950 FIFA World Cup.

Career
Zetter played as a defender for Club Atlas, captaining the side to its only Mexican Primera División championship in 1951.

Distinction
Felipe is the first footballer from Guanajuato to participate in a FIFA World Cup (1950).

References

External links
FIFA profile

1923 births
2013 deaths
Mexico international footballers
Association football defenders
Atlas F.C. footballers
Atlas F.C. managers
1950 FIFA World Cup players
Footballers from Guanajuato
Mexican footballers
Liga MX players
Mexican football managers